Mehrabi (Persian: مهرابی or محرابی) is a toponym and a Persian habitational surname for a person from one of two Iranian villages named Mehrab. It may refer to:

 Kalareh-ye Mehrabi, a village in Kermanshah Province, Iran
 Tolombeh-ye Fathabad-e Mehrabi, a village in Kerman Province, Iran

People with the surname
 Ehsan Mehrabi (born 1978), Iranian journalist 
 Kaveh Mehrabi (born 1982),  Iranian badminton player
 Massoud Mehrabi (1954–2020), Iranian journalist, writer and caricaturist
 Zahra Mehrabi (1965–2011), dual Dutch and Iranian citizen who was executed in Iran for drug trafficking

See also 
 Mehrab (disambiguation)
 Mihrab

Persian-language surnames